Dąbrówka  is a village in the administrative district of Gmina Drzewica, within Opoczno County, Łódź Voivodeship, in central Poland.

The village has a population of 348.

References

Villages in Opoczno County